The Temple protestant de l'Oratoire du Louvre, also Église réformée de l'Oratoire du Louvre, is a historic Protestant church located at 145 rue Saint-Honoré – 160 rue de Rivoli in the 1st arrondissement of Paris, across the street from the Louvre.  It was founded in 1611 by Pierre de Bérulle as the French branch of the Oratory of Saint Philip Neri.  It was made the royal chapel of the Louvre Palace by Louis XIII on December 23, 1623, and was host to the funerals of both Louis and Cardinal Richelieu.  Work on the church was suspended in 1625 and not resumed until 1740, with the church completed in 1745.

It was suppressed in 1792 during the French Revolution, looted, stripped of its decor, and used to store theater sets.  In 1811, it was given by Napoleon to the Protestant congregation of Saint-Louis-du-Louvre when that building was demolished to make way for the expansion of the Louvre.  A statue and monument of Admiral Gaspard de Coligny, the great Huguenot leader of the 16th century, was built on the rue de Rivoli end of the church in 1889.  It continues as one of the most prominent Reformed congregations in Paris, noted for its liberal theology.  The closest métro station is Louvre – Rivoli.

Prominent pastors

 Paul-Henri Marron 1811-1832
 Jacques Antoine Rabaut-Pommier 1811-1816
 Jean-Frédéric Mestrezat 1811-1807
 Henri François Juillerat 1816-1867
 Frédéric Monod 1819-1849
 Athanase Josué Coquerel 1832-
 Joseph Martin-Paschoud 1836-1866
 Adolphe Monod 1847-1856
 Matthieu Rouville 1850-
 Auguste-Laurent Montandon 1860-1906
 Numa Recolin 1882-1893
 Auguste Decoppet 1882-1906
 Ariste Viguié 1882-1891
 Jules-Émile Roberty 1891-1925
 Élisée Lacheret 1893-1902
 Théodore Monod 1902-1906
 John Viénot 1906-1932
 Wilfred Monod 1907-1938
 Paul Vergara 1922-1954
 André-Numa Bertrand 1926-1946
 Émile Guiraud 1933-1937
 Gustave Vidal 1938-1960
 Élie Lauriol 1946-1961
 Pierre Ducros 1954-1968
 René Château 1961-1978
 Bernard Reymond
 Laurent Gagnebin 1963-1965
 Christian Mazel 1964-1988
 André Pierredon
 Jean-Michel Perrault 1995-2003
 Pierre-Yves Ruff 1997-2001
 Werner Burki 2003-2008
 Florence Taubmann 2003-2007
 Marc Pernot 2007-2017
 James Woody 2009-2016
 Richard Cadoux 2017-2018
 Béatrice Cléro-Mazire 2018-présent
 Agnès Adeline-Schaeffer 2019-présent

Gallery

References

Sources

External links

 Official website 

Oratoire
Buildings and structures in the 1st arrondissement of Paris